Coreopsis calliopsidea is a species of flowering plant in the daisy family known by the common name leafstem tickseed. It is endemic to California. The plant grows in some of the southern coastal mountain ranges and Transverse Ranges and the Mojave Desert from Alameda and Inyo Counties south to Riverside County.

Description
Coreopsis calliopsidea is an annual herb producing one or more stems growing up to about 40 centimeters (16 inches) tall, or sometimes taller. The slightly fleshy leaves are located mainly around the base of the stem, each divided into several narrow lobes.

The inflorescence consists of a single flower head with a bell-shaped involucre of triangular phyllaries. The head has a center of up to 50 tiny yellow disc florets and a fringe of usually 8 bright yellow ray florets each up to 3.5 centimeters (1.4 inches) long.

The fruit is an achene. The fruit of the ray floret is oval and hairless and lacks a pappus; that of the disc floret is more slender, shiny, lined with hairs, and tipped with a pappus of scales.

References

External links
United States Department of Agriculture Plants Profile
Coreopsis calliopsidea — Calphotos  Photo gallery, University of California

calliopsidea
Endemic flora of California
Flora of the California desert regions
Natural history of the California chaparral and woodlands
Natural history of the Mojave Desert
Plants described in 1836
Natural history of the Transverse Ranges
Flora without expected TNC conservation status